Coleen K. Menlove (born July 1, 1943) is an American religious leader who was the tenth Primary general president of the Church of Jesus Christ of Latter-day Saints (LDS Church) from 1999 to 2005.

Menlove was born and raised in Salt Lake City, Utah. She earned a bachelor's degree in elementary education at the University of Utah and later completed a master's degree in education from Brigham Young University. She taught part-time in elementary schools in Salt Lake City.

Prior to her call as Primary General President, Menlove served on the general board of the church's Young Women organization. In October 1999, Menlove was selected to succeed Patricia P. Pinegar to lead the LDS Church's organization for children. She called Sydney S. Reynolds as first counselor and Gayle M. Clegg as second counselor. During Menlove's tenure, the Primary organization celebrated its 125th anniversary. In 2005, Menlove was released and was succeeded by Cheryl C. Lant. Menlove's general conference addresses included Living Happily Ever After.

In 2005, Menlove was awarded the Silver Buffalo Award by the Boy Scouts of America.

Menlove and her husband, Dean W. Menlove, were married in 1964 and they are the parents of seven children.

Sermons and publications
“Living Happily Ever After,” Ensign, May 2000, p. 12
"Patience—in the Process of Time", 2002 BYU Women's Conference
"Prophets, Prayers, and Promised Blessings", BYU–Idaho Education Week, 2003-06-27
“Show You Know,” Friend, June 2003, p. 16
“A Voice of Gladness for Our Children,” Liahona, November 2002, p. 13

References

External links
 Coleen K. Menlove Official Profile

1943 births
Living people
American leaders of the Church of Jesus Christ of Latter-day Saints
Brigham Young University alumni
General Presidents of the Primary (LDS Church)
People from Salt Lake City
University of Utah alumni
Young Women (organization) people
Latter Day Saints from Utah